Felicity Price is an Australian actress and screenwriter. She co-wrote and starred in Wish You Were Here which saw her nominated for the 2012 AACTA Awards for Best Actress in a Leading Role and won Best Original Screenplay.

Filmography
TV
Wolf Creek (2017) TV series – Nina Webber (6 episodes)
Rescue Special Ops (2011) TV series – Wendy Schmidt (1 episode)
Home and Away (2009) TV series – Jane Avent (8 episodes)
All Saints (2006) TV series – Katrina King (1 episode)
Dynasty: The Making of a Guilty Pleasure (2005) TV movie – Dottie
The Alice (2004) TV movie – Felicity Marione
The Postcard Bandit (2004) TV movie – Receptionist
Always Greener (2002) TV series – Anne Clarke (4 episodes)
Farscape (2002) TV series – Princess Katralla (3 episodes)
Water Rats (1997) TV series – Sally (1 episode)
Big Sky (1997) TV series – Kirstie (1 episode)
Film
Heartthrob (2017) – Collette
Bad Girl (2016) – Michelle Anderson
The Duel (2015) – Naomi
The Gift (2015) – Dr. Angela Derezio
Wish You Were Here (2012) – Alice Flannery
West (2007) – Elizabeth
Unfolding Florence: The Many Lives of Florence Broadhurst (2006) – Young Florence Broadhurst
Russian Doll (2001) – Phaedra
Change of Heart (1999) – Monique
Occasional Coarse Language (1998) – Bookseller
The Sugar Factory (1998) – Jacquiline

References

External links
 

Date of birth missing (living people)
Living people
Australian film actresses
Australian television actresses
Year of birth missing (living people)